Saarlia Island (old spelling: Sârdlia) is an uninhabited island in Avannaata municipality in northwestern Greenland.

Geography 
The highest point on the island is an unnamed  hill in the center of the island.

References

Uninhabited islands of Greenland
Melville Bay
Islands of the Upernavik Archipelago